opened in Masuda, Shimane Prefecture, Japan, in 2005.

See also
 List of Cultural Properties of Japan - paintings (Shimane)
 List of Historic Sites of Japan (Shimane)
 List of Museums in Shimane Prefecture

References

External links
  Iwami Art Museum
  Iwami Art Museum
  Collection Database
 Iwami Art Museum at Google Cultural Institute

Museums in Shimane Prefecture
Art museums and galleries in Japan
Masuda, Shimane
Museums established in 2005
2005 establishments in Japan